Winslow may refer to:

Places

United Kingdom
 Winslow, Buckinghamshire, England, a market town and civil parish
 Winslow Rural District, Buckinghamshire, a rural district from 1894 to 1974

United States and Canada
 Rural Municipality of Winslow No. 319, Saskatchewan, Canada
 Winslow, Arizona, a city
 Winslow, Arkansas, a city
 Winslow, Illinois, a village
 Winslow, Indiana, a town
 Winslow, Kentucky, an unincorporated community
 Winslow, Maine, a New England town
 Winslow (CDP), Maine, the primary village in the town
 Winslow, Nebraska, a village
 Winslow, Pennsylvania, an unincorporated community
 Winslow, Bainbridge Island, Washington, the downtown area of the city of Bainbridge Island
 Winslow, West Virginia, an unincorporated community
 Winslow Township (disambiguation)
 Winslow Lake (disambiguation), various lakes in Canada and the United States

Elsewhere
 Winslow Reef, Cook Islands
 Winslow Reef, Phoenix Islands, Kiribati
 Winslow, Victoria, Australia
 Winslow (crater), impact crater on Mars
 8270 Winslow, an asteroid

People and fictional characters
 Winslow (surname)
 Winslow (given name)

Transport
 Winslow station (Arizona), United States
 Winslow railway station, England

Other uses
 Winslow High School (disambiguation)
 , three US Navy ships
 Winslow Air Force Station, a former US Air Force radar station in Arizona
 Winslow Chemical Laboratory, a former laboratory of Rensselaer Polytechnic Institute, Troy, New York, United States
 Winslow Marine Railway and Shipbuilding Company, a shipyard from 1903 to 1959 in the state of Washington, United States
 Winslow (band), an American rock band
 Winslow (bidding system), a contract bridge bidding system

See also
 Winslow House (disambiguation)
 Winslow West, Arizona
 The Winslow Boy (disambiguation)
 Justice Winslow (disambiguation)